Kingshurst is a post-war housing estate and civil parish in the Metropolitan Borough of Solihull, in the West Midlands. Smith's Wood borders it to the north and east, Fordbridge to the south and the Shard End area of Birmingham to the west.

History
The name Kingshurst comes from having previously been a Royal Manor, and "hurst" meaning wood. The earliest record of Kingshurst is in documents from the late 13th and early 14th centuries, when it is referred to as part of the Manor of Coleshill. Tenant farming was administered from here and Simon de Montford of Coleshill was an English nobleman who built a moated manor house near Kingshurst. The Hall had its own park and farmlands.

The Mountfords 1332-1618
Kingshurst took on an independent existence from Coleshill with the arrival of the Mountfords. It is unclear how Kingshurst came into their possession although it is probable that they bought the area around 1332 from the Clintons, who were then Lords of the Manor at Coleshill. What is certain is that they were in possession by about 1352.

The end of Kingshurst Hall
The last proprietor of Kingshurst Hall, Walter Townsend, lacked the means to prevent the house from falling into a state of disrepair. All plans to salvage it came to nothing, due to a lack of funds. In 1960, Walter was moved to a house in Castle Bromwich and in 1962 the hall was demolished.

The remains of the moat of Kingshurst Hall are still visible today.

Yorkswood
During World War I, much of the woodland in Kingshurst was cut down to help with the war effort. The Birmingham and District Association of Boy Scouts were able to buy a patch of land at a bargain price and set up a permanent camp there. This land was halfway between Kingshurst and Shard End. It was called Yorkswood and opened in 1923. The site benefited from permanent washhouses and latrines, a swimming-pool, a training centre and headquarters, guesthouse, warden’s hut and other huts.

The entrance to the camp was flanked by a series of griffin statues. These had come from the roof of Lewis's Department Store on Corporation Street in Birmingham when it was being renovated. After the camp closed in 1972, they were placed on the housing estate (Kendrick Avenue and nearby roads) built upon the site of the camp.

Kingshurst today
Kingshurst is now a mainly residential area.  Built as an overspill housing estate in the early 1950s for the City of Birmingham, it became part of the Metropolitan Borough of Solihull in 1974.

There are three primary schools, Kingshurst, St. Anthonys and Yorkswood, a library and a small shopping area. The Anglican church is dedicated to St Barnabas and is situated off Church Close, the Catholic church is dedicated to St Anthony, the Methodist Church situated in Gilson Way and there is an evangelical church, Kingshurst Evangelical Church (KEC Church) situated on Cooks Lane corner with Forth Drive, which is much involved within Kingshurst Community. The nearest secondary schools are Smith's Wood Academy, across the Chester Road in Smith's Wood, the CTC Kingshurst Academy, and John Henry Newman Catholic College which are off Cooks Lane. There is a small local park off Gilson Way/Marston Drive next to a main shopping area. The children's play area is the main facility with the freedom to play outdoor games and activities.

According to the 2001 census, Kingshurst has a population of 8,126.

Notable residents
Gary Shaw, the former Aston Villa footballer, was born at a house on Meriden Drive in January 1961 and lived there until the 1980s, by which time he was established as a key player at Villa.

Rapper Lady Leshurr was born and raised in Kingshurst.

Mike Kendall Famous sleuth and traveller attended Kingshurst Boys School in the 1970s. Reportedly his ideal travel destination is Vindication Island, although he has not yet been.

Parish council
Kingshurst has a parish council, to which it elects 12 members every four years.

References

External links

Map of Kingshurst
City Technology College
 North Solihull Regeneration website

Areas of the West Midlands (county)
Civil parishes in the West Midlands (county)
Solihull